Haskell Garrett (born May 4, 1998) is an American football defensive tackle who is currently a free agent. He played college football at Ohio State.

Early years
Originally from Vermont, Garrett moved to Hawaii, then Nevada at age 13, after the death of his father. Garrett attended Bishop Gorman High School in Summerlin, Nevada. During his career, he had 25 sacks. Garrett played in the 2017 U. S. Army All-American Bowl. He committed to Ohio State University to play college football.

College career
During his first three years at Ohio State (2017–2019), Garrett recorded 20 tackles over 33 games as a rotational defensive lineman. In August 2020, prior to his senior season, Garrett was shot in the face while attempting to break up a fight.  Despite the shooting he returned to play just two months later. He was named an All-American that season by CBS. On December 27, 2021, Garrett announced that he would be opting out of the 2022 Rose Bowl and declaring for the 2022 NFL Draft.

Professional career

Garrett signed with the Tennessee Titans as an undrafted free agent on May 13, 2022. He was released on August 16, 2022.

References

External links
 Tennessee Titans bio
Ohio State Buckeyes bio

1998 births
Living people
People from Summerlin, Nevada
Sportspeople from the Las Vegas Valley
Players of American football from Nevada
Sportspeople from Burlington, Vermont
Players of American football from Vermont
American football defensive tackles
Bishop Gorman High School alumni
Ohio State Buckeyes football players
Tennessee Titans players